The 1998 NCAA Division III women's basketball tournament was the 17th annual tournament hosted by the NCAA to determine the national champion of Division III women's collegiate basketball in the United States.

Washington University in St. Louis defeated Southern Maine in the championship game, 66–50, to claim the Bears' first Division III national title, their first of four consecutive.

The championship rounds were hosted by the University of Southern Maine in Gorham, Maine.

Bracket

Final Four

All-tournament team
 Amy Schweizer, Washington University in St. Louis
 Alia Fischer, Washington University in St. Louis
 Joanna Brown, Southern Maine
 Julie Plant, Southern Maine
 Suzy Venet, Mount Union

See also
1998 NCAA Division III men's basketball tournament
1998 NCAA Division I women's basketball tournament
1998 NCAA Division II women's basketball tournament
1998 NAIA Division I women's basketball tournament
1998 NAIA Division II women's basketball tournament

References

 
NCAA Division III women's basketball tournament
1998 in sports in Maine